Mark Wilson (born 8 October 1977 in Doncaster, South Yorkshire) is an English professional darts player who competes in Professional Darts Corporation events.

Darts career
Wilson entered UK Q-School in 2018, winning a two-year Tour Card, by finishing in the top 15 on the Order of Merit, after the four days of Q-School were completed.

References

External links

1977 births
Living people
Professional Darts Corporation former tour card holders
English darts players